Liu Youju (born in 1955, Jiexi, Guangdong, China) is a contemporary Chinese art critic, calligrapher, avant-garde artist, and practitioner of "illusionist painting".

In his early years, he was engaged in poetry, prose, and literary criticism. Some of his poems were included in the Selection of Contemporary Poems by A Thousand of Authors (Chinese: "當代千家詩選粹").

In 2011, he left the Chinese Calligrapher's Association and later founded illusionist painting. His illusionist paintings have been exhibited at the Nixon Presidential Museum in the U.S., the British Museum, the  Louvre Museum of Art in France, and the art gallery of the Academy of Fine Arts of Florence (Accademia di Belle Arti di Firenze) in Italy.

In 2016, Liu organized a personal workshop on his personal artworks at the Academy of Fine Arts of Florence.

Exhibitions 
 2014, the Richard Nixon Museum, Yorba Linda, California, United States.
 March 2015, Liu Youju's personal exhibition,  Beijing's Today Art Museum.
 August 2015, "Rational Return of Illusionism" – Liu Youju Art Exhibition, the Maréchal Hall of the Louvre Decorative Art museum.

Auction 
One of Liu's untitled work was sold at Poly International Auction Co. in 2017, realizing the price of 22,515 US dollars.

References 

1955 births
Living people
Chinese contemporary artists
People's Republic of China calligraphers